Bishe Kola Airbase  is a military airport located in Bisheh Kola near Amol, Iran.

See also

List of airports in Iran

References

External links

Iranian airbases
Airports in Iran
Buildings and structures in Mazandaran Province
Transportation in Mazandaran Province